Petkeljärvi National Park is a national park in Ilomantsi in the North Karelia region of Finland. Its specialities are e.g. fortification from the Continuation War, some of which have been renovated, and valuable eskers. The park's vegetation mostly consists of light Scots pine forests. The park, along with Patvinsuo National Park, belongs to the North-Karelian biosphere reserves of UNESCO.

See also 
 List of national parks of Finland
 Protected areas of Finland

References

External links
 Outdoors.fi: Petkeljärvi National Park
 

National parks of Finland
Biosphere reserves of Finland
Geography of North Karelia
Ilomantsi
Protected areas established in 1956
Tourist attractions in North Karelia